Pityphyllum is a genus of orchids comprising 7 known species native to Venezuela, Bolivia, Peru, Ecuador and Colombia.

 Pityphyllum amesianum Schltr. - Colombia, Venezuela
 Pityphyllum antioquiense Schltr. - Colombia
 Pityphyllum hirtzii Dodson - Ecuador
 Pityphyllum huancabambae (Kraenzl.) Whitten - Bolivia, Peru, Ecuador
 Pityphyllum laricinum  (Kraenzl.) Schltr. -  Peru, Ecuador
 Pityphyllum pinoides H.R.Sweet - Ecuador
 Pityphyllum saragurense (Dodson) Whitten  -  Peru, Ecuador

References 

Orchids of South America
Maxillarieae genera
Maxillariinae